Sven Merkel (born 27 March 1965) is a Hong Kong sailor. He competed in the Flying Dutchman event at the 1992 Summer Olympics.

References

External links
 

1965 births
Living people
Hong Kong male sailors (sport)
Olympic sailors of Hong Kong
Sailors at the 1992 Summer Olympics – Flying Dutchman
Place of birth missing (living people)